The Komatsu House (Komatsu-no-miya) or Higashifushimi (東伏見) ōke (princely house) was the sixth oldest branch of the Imperial House of Japan, created from branches of the Fushimi-no-miya house, presently extinct. It was founded by Imperial Prince Yoshiaki, the seventh son of Prince Fushimi-no-miya Kuniye, in 1872. Prince Yoshiaki was given the title of komatsu-no-miya and changed his first name to Akihito. Since he died without an heir, the Komatsu-no-miya reverted to Higashifushimi-no-miya (東伏見宮家) in 1903.

Higashifushimi-no-miya / Komatsu-no-Miya
The Higashifushimi-no-miya house was formed by Prince Yoshiaki, seventh son of Prince Fushimi Kuniye.

In 1931, Emperor Hirohito directed his brother-in-law, Prince Kuni Kunihide, to leave Imperial Family status and become Count Higashifushimi Kunihide (hakushaku under the kazoku peerage system), to prevent the Higashifushimi name from extinction. Dowager Princess Higashifushimi Kaneko became a commoner on 14 October 1947. She died in Tokyo in 1955.

References

 
History articles needing translation from Japanese Wikipedia